The Panhandle pebblesnail, scientific name Somatogyrus virginicus, is a species of very small or minute freshwater snail with an operculum, an aquatic gastropod mollusk in the family Hydrobiidae. This species is endemic to the United States.  Its natural habitat is rivers, where it prefers areas with the fastest current.

References

 

Molluscs of the United States
Somatogyrus
Gastropods described in 1904
Taxonomy articles created by Polbot